Valiyakulangara Devi Temple is located about 5 km from Haripad and 4 km from Thrikkunnappuzha. It is located 3 km from the National Waterway-3 as well as from the National Highway-47.

The major festival is the Aswathi festival in Feb-March, famous for the Fireworks show and the Kettukaazcha (procession of chariots).
	
'Kettukazhcha' displays sculpted and decorated forms of six temple cars known as 'Kuthiras', five Therus' (Chariots ) and icons of Bhima and Hanuman.

See also
 Temples of Kerala

External links

Hindu temples in Alappuzha district
Devi temples in Kerala